, translated as Moribund Society and Anarchy, is an 1893 book by Jean Grave that argues for the speedy disintegration of moribund societal institutions.

Publication 

Grave first published the book in 1893. Octave Mirbeau wrote a preface for the edition. Grave was put on trial for the book in 1894.

In London, Grave met American anarchist Voltairine de Cleyre, who agreed to translate the book from French to English at the urging of London anarchists, who offered her a British publisher. She began her translation, Moribund Society and Anarchy, upon her return to the United States in late 1897. Abraham Isaak ultimately published the translation in the United States with the San Francisco Free Society Library in 1899. De Cleyre wrote a preface for the translation.

Moshe Katz also translated the work.

Notes

Further reading

Further reading

External links 

 Full text in French and English

1893 non-fiction books
French-language books
Books about anarchism
French non-fiction books